Budget Direct is an insurance brand of Auto & General headquartered in Brisbane, Australia. Their Car and Home Insurance policies are underwritten by Auto & General Insurance Company Limited. Auto & General Insurance Company is an Australian insurance company regulated by APRA and is an active member of the Insurance Council of Australia.

Budget Direct is part of the Budget Insurance group, established in the early 1970s, which collects  billion in premiums each year for the group's 6.8 million policies.

Operations
Budget Direct operates three call centres located in Queensland at Kawana Waters, North Lakes as well as at the company's headquarters located in Toowong, Brisbane. The company also has multiple assessment centres in Brisbane, Sydney and Melbourne. As of April 2020, the company has over 1 million policy holders and over 1,700 staff. In 2016 Budget Direct launched in Singapore offering Car, Motorcycle and Travel Insurance.

Advertising
Budget Direct's previous television advertisements depicted a couple called Michael and Michelle. The ads revolved around Michelle's mispronunciation of the word "Budget" whilst explaining the benefits of Budget Direct insurance to Michael who continually corrects her pronunciation. In August 2013 Budget Direct rebranded with an alien version of the shower ad with animated aliens instead of Michelle and Michael. This also included a revelation of a new brand positioning and logo created by Hulsbosch. In January 2014 it was reported that the brand had engaged 303Lowe with the release of new TV ads featuring a daredevil by the name of Captain Risky and tagline "We don't insure Captain Risky to keep prices low", to explain the brand's low to medium risk market positioning. In 2018 a new series of television advertisements were launched with a detective character called 'Sarge' 
The advertisements feature Sarge and a sidekick tackling fantastical and science fiction based mysteries with the tagline Insurence Solved.

Awards
Budget Direct has won the CANSTAR award for Outstanding Value Car Insurance every year from 2007 to 2022. Budget Direct won the Money Magazine Insurer of the Year award for their Car and Home Insurance products every year from 2017 to 2022.  They have also won the Money Magazine Best-Value Car Insurance award from 2019 to 2022.

References

External links

Insurance companies of Australia
Financial services companies established in 1999
Companies based in Brisbane
1999 establishments in Australia